79 Pall Mall is a grade II listed building in Pall Mall, London. It was designed by David Brandon for the Eagle Insurance Company in 1866–68. There formerly stood on the site a brick townhouse occupied by Nell Gwynne after her retirement from the stage and a blue plaque notes the fact.

References 

Grade II listed buildings in the City of Westminster